Nipa‐Like Domain‐Containing 4, also known as NIPAL4 or Ichthyin, is a gene that is predicted to code for a transmembrane protein with nine transmembrane domains. NIPAL4 codes for the protein magnesium transporter NIPA4, which acts as a  transporter.

Expression 
NIPAL4 is mainly expressed in the skin, specifically in the granular layer of the epidermis.

Function 
NIPAL4 codes for a magnesium transporter that can also transport other divalent cations such as Ba2+, Mn2+, Sr2+ and Co2+, though to a much less extent than Mg2+. There is also evidence that NIPAL4 is involved in the synthesis of very long chain fatty acids involved in the epidermal lipid metabolism. Disruptions to this pathway results in impaired skin function, causing the symptoms of ARCI.

Pathology 
Mutations in this gene account for 16% of autosomal recessive congenital ichthyosis (ARCI) cases, making it the 2nd most common gene involved with this disease. Since its first identification in 2004, 18 disease‐causing mutations have been reported in NIPAL4.

See also 
 Lamellar Ichthyosis
 Congenital ichthyosiform erythroderma
Ichthyosis
Skin

References 

Genes
Genes on human chromosome 5
Genetics